Payo Ji Maine Ram Ratan Dhan Payo is a Rajasthani language poem by 15th- century Indian poet Mirabai. In this poem, Mirabai says that she attains a great wealth of Lord's name. The poem was popularized by Indian singer Lata Mangeshkar (1929–2022).

Lyrics 

Original Hindi Lyrics:

English Translation:

See also 

 Meerabai
 Saanson ki mala pe

References 

Rajasthani literature
Indian poems
Krishna in popular culture